KJCM may refer to:

 KJCM-FM, the fictional radio station featured in the television series Midnight Caller
 KJCM (FM), a radio station (100.3 FM) licensed to Snyder, Oklahoma, United States